Setenil de las Bodegas is a town (pueblo) and municipality in the province of Cádiz, Spain, famous for its dwellings built into rock overhangs above the Río Guadalporcún. According to the 2005 census, the city has a population of 3,016 inhabitants.

It has a distinctive setting along a narrow river gorge. The town extends along the course of the Rio Trejo with some houses being built into the rock walls of the gorge itself, created by enlarging natural caves or overhangs and adding an external wall.

Setenil has a reputation for its meat products, particularly chorizo sausage and cerdo (pork) from pigs bred in the surrounding hills. As well as meat, it has a reputation for producing fine pasteles (pastries), and its bars and restaurants are among the best in the region. Its outlying farms also provide Ronda and other local towns with much of their fruit and vegetables.

History

Modern Setenil evolved from a fortified Moorish town that occupied a bluff overlooking a sharp bend in the Rio Trejo northwest of Ronda. The castle dates from at least the Almohad period in the 12th century.

The site was certainly occupied during the Roman invasion of the region in the 1st century AD. Setenil was once believed to be the successor of the Roman town of Laccipo, but it was subsequently proved that Laccipo became the town of Casares in Malaga. Given the evidence of other nearby cave-dwelling societies, such as those at the Cueva de la Pileta west of Ronda, where habitation has been tracked back more than 25,000 years, it is possible that Setenil was occupied much much earlier. Most evidence of this would have been erased by continuous habitation.

Tradition holds that the town's Castilian name came from the Roman Latin phrase septem nihil ('seven times nothing'). This is said to refer to the Moorish town's resistance to Christian assault, allegedly being captured only after seven sieges. This took place in the final years of the Christian Reconquest. Besieged unsuccessfully in 1407, Setenil finally fell in 1484 when Christian forces expelled the Moorish occupants. Using gunpowder artillery, the Christians took fifteen days to capture the castle whose ruins dominate the town today.

Due to the strategic importance of Setenil, the victory was celebrated widely in Castile and was the source of several legends in local folklore. Isabella I of Castile is said to have miscarried during the siege with the ermita of San Sebastian being built as a tribute to the dead child, who was named Sebastian. However, there appears to be no historical basis to this story.
 
The full name of Setenil de las Bodegas dates from the 15th century, when new Christian settlers, in addition to maintaining the Arab olive and almond groves, introduced vineyards. The first two crops still flourish in the district but the once flourishing wineries—bodegas— were wiped out by the phylloxera insect infestation of the 1860s, which effectively destroyed most European vine stocks.

Demographics

Gallery

References

External links 

Setenil de las Bodegas – Sistema de Información Multiterritorial de Andalucía
 Setenil de las Bodegas at Unusual places website

Municipalities of the Province of Cádiz